Underground is the tenth studio album by jazz saxophonist Chris Potter released on the Sunnyside label in 2006. It features guitarist Wayne Krantz, keyboardist Craig Taborn and drummer Nate Smith.

Reception

The Allmusic review by Thom Jurek awarded the album 3 stars stating "Underground won't come close to appealing to everyone, but so what? It's a fine Potter outing and studio documentation of a fine band that has actually kept the jazz in fusion and vice versa".

All About Jazz correspondent John Kelman observed "With Underground Potter delivers the album that his consistently impressive past efforts only suggested was possible. Combining complex and emotionally wide-reaching compositions with often knotty, yet always accessible grooves, Potter has finally fashioned an album that, more than announcing his potential, delivers it from start to finish with a clear voice ... Potter is by no means at his creative peak—or so we can only hope—but with Underground he has made his most personal and successful statement to date".

In The Guardian, John Fordham wrote "When powerful employers give him the nod, Potter can sound like one of the best saxophonists on the planet, one who seems to have fully absorbed the jazz-sax tradition from Sidney Bechet to Tim Berne. He has been more unsettled as a leader, but this set launches a scalding contemporary-fusion band that includes two gifted younger mavericks".

Track listing
All compositions by Chris Potter except where indicated
 "Next Best Western" – 9:40
 "Morning Bell" (Colin Greenwood, Ed O'Brien, Jonny Greenwood, Phil Selway, Thom Yorke) – 5:41
 "Nudnik" – 9:53
 "Lotus Blossom" (Billy Strayhorn) – 5:09
 "Big Top" – 11:46
 "The Wheel" – 6:59
 "Celestial Nomad" – 6:28
 "Underground" – 11:11
 "Yesterday" (John Lennon, Paul McCartney) – 2:50

Personnel
Chris Potter – tenor saxophone
Wayne Krantz, Adam Rogers (tracks 6 & 9) − guitar
Craig Taborn – Fender Rhodes
Nate Smith – drums

References

Chris Potter (jazz saxophonist) albums
2006 albums
Sunnyside Records albums